HMS Niger was a 32-gun  fifth rate frigate of the Royal Navy.

History
She was launched in 1759.

In 1766, under the command of Sir Thomas Adams, Niger travelled to Newfoundland and Labrador. Also on board were Constantine Phipps, and the English botanist Joseph Banks. The purpose of the journey was to transport a party of mariners to Chateau Bay, Newfoundland and Labrador to build a fort, to continue strengthening relations with the native population, and to survey some of the coast of Newfoundland.

Banks collected many species of plants and animals during that journey, including many which were previously unknown or undescribed by Europeans. In 1766 Banks met James Cook briefly in St John's, through their mutual friend Thomas Adams. This meeting would lead to Banks joining Cook on his first circumnavigation from 1769 to 1771.

During the American Revolutionary War in 1776, Niger briefly engaged Gurnet Fort guarding Plymouth, Massachusetts while searching for patriot privateers. Niger grounded but was soon refloated. Plymouth Light was damaged, but there were no other casualties.

Because Niger served in the navy's Egyptian campaign (8 March to 8 September 1801), her officers and crew qualified for the clasp "Egypt" to the Naval General Service Medal that the Admiralty issued in 1847 to all surviving claimants.

On 21 May 1806 Niger was in company with the bomb vessel  and the brig  when they detained Trende Damen (Three Ladies).

Fate
The Navy converted Niger to a prison hospital ship in May 1809, and renamed her Negro in 1813. She was sold in 1814.

Notes

Citations

References

Frigates of the Royal Navy
Ships built in Sheerness
1759 ships